Anders Bugge (1 May 1889 – 25 December 1955) was a Norwegian theologist and art historian.

Biography
Anders Ragnar Bugge was born in Sandsvær in Kongsberg, Norway. He was the son of 
Christian August Bugge (1853–1928) and Dina Alette Danielsen (1855–1933). 
His father was a theologian and a chaplain at Botsfengslet.  
He attended the University of Kristiania, where he graduated with a degree in art in 1907  and became cand.theol. in 1914. 
In 1912–18 he was assistant and later curator at the Museum of Art and Design in Kristiania.
In 1929 he defended his doctoral dissertation.

Anders Bugge was a theologian by education, but came to dedicate his life to art history.
He worked several years for the Norwegian Directorate for Cultural Heritage and was appointed professor at the University of Oslo from 1936 to 1955. He was a member of the Norwegian Academy of Science and Letters and was decorated Knight of the Swedish Order of the Polar Star.

References

1889 births
1955 deaths
People from Kongsberg
Norwegian art historians
University of Oslo alumni
Academic staff of the University of Oslo
Knights of the Order of the Polar Star
Members of the Norwegian Academy of Science and Letters